The Leibniz–Clarke correspondence was a scientific, theological and philosophical debate conducted in an exchange of letters between the German thinker Gottfried Wilhelm Leibniz and Samuel Clarke, an English supporter of Isaac Newton during the years 1715 and 1716.  The exchange began because of a letter Leibniz wrote to Caroline of Ansbach, in which he remarked that Newtonian physics was detrimental to natural theology.  Eager to defend the Newtonian view, Clarke responded, and the correspondence continued until the death of Leibniz in 1716.

Although a variety of subjects are touched on in the letters, the main interest for modern readers is in the dispute between the absolute theory of space favoured by Newton and Clarke, and Leibniz's relational approach.  Also important is the conflict between Clarke's and Leibniz's opinions on free will and whether God must create the best of all possible worlds.

Leibniz had published only one book on moral matters, the Theodicée (1710), and his more metaphysical views had never been exposed to a sufficient extent, so the collected letters were met with interest by their contemporaries. The primary dispute between Leibniz and Newton about calculus was still fresh in the public's mind and it was taken as a matter of course that it was Newton himself who stood behind Clarke's replies.

Editions
The Leibniz-Clarke letters were first published under Clarke's name in the year following Leibniz's death. He wrote a preface, took care of the translation from French, added notes and some of his own writing. In 1720 Pierre Desmaizeaux published a similar volume in a French translation, including quotes from Newton's work. It is quite certain that for both editions the opinion of Newton himself has been sought and Leibniz left at a disadvantage.  However the German translation of the correspondence published by Kohler, also in 1720, contained a reply to Clarke's last letter which Leibniz had not been able to answer. The letters have been reprinted in most collections of Leibniz's works and regularly published in stand-alone editions.

See also
Philosophy of space and time
Principle of sufficient reason

Notes

References
 G.V. Leroy, Die philosophische Probleme in dem Briefwechsel Leibniz und Clarke, Giessen, 1893.

Rowe, William L., "Can God Be Free?", Oxford UP, 2004. .

External links
 Complete transcription of the 1717 edition at The Newton Project
 Stanford encyclopedia of philosophy - Divine Freedom

1715 documents
1716 documents
Philosophical debates
Historical physics publications
Space
Correspondences
Works by Gottfried Wilhelm Leibniz
Caroline of Ansbach